Melquiades Verduras Tascón (born 24 October 1968) is a Spanish rower. He competed at the 1992 Summer Olympics and the 1996 Summer Olympics.

References

External links
 

1968 births
Living people
Spanish male rowers
Olympic rowers of Spain
Rowers at the 1992 Summer Olympics
Rowers at the 1996 Summer Olympics
People from Basauri
Sportspeople from Biscay
Rowers from the Basque Country (autonomous community)